Banksia hewardiana is a species of openly branched shrub that is endemic to Western Australia. It has linear, serrated leaves with sharply pointed teeth, head of up to sixty lemon-yellow flowers and oblong follicles.

Description
Banksia hewardiana is an openly branched shrub that typically grows to a height of  but does not form a lignotuber. There are between five and fifteen sharply pointed teeth on each side of the leaves.

Taxonomy and naming
This species was first formally described in 1856 by Carl Meissner who gave it the name Dryandra hewardiana and published the description in de Candolle's Prodromus Systematis Naturalis Regni Vegetabilis from specimens collected by James Drummond. The specific epithet (hewardiana) honours the English botanist Robert Heward (1791–1877). In 2007 Austin Mast and Kevin Thiele transferred all dryandras to the genus Banksia and renamed this species Banksia hewardiana.

Distribution and habitat
Banksia hewardiana grows in woodland and heath between Cataby, New Norcia and Moora.

Conservation status
This banksia is classified as "not threatened" by the Government of Western Australia Department of Parks and Wildlife.

References

 

hewardiana
Endemic flora of Western Australia
Taxa named by Carl Meissner
Plants described in 1856
Taxa named by Kevin Thiele